Inge Larsen is a 1923 German silent drama film directed by Hans Steinhoff and starring Henny Porten, Paul Otto and Ressel Orla.

It was shot on location in Copenhagen. The film's sets were designed by art directors Alfred Junge, Ludwig Kainer and Fritz Lück.

Cast
 Henny Porten as Inge Larsen  
 Paul Otto as Baron Kerr  
 Ressel Orla as Evelyne  
 Vasilij Vronski as Kerrs Diener  
 Paul Hansen as Jan Olsen  
 Hans Albers as gelangweilter Attaché  
 Ludwig Rex 
 Leopold von Ledebur

References

Bibliography
 Bock, Hans-Michael & Bergfelder, Tim. The Concise CineGraph. Encyclopedia of German Cinema. Berghahn Books, 2009.

External links 
 

1923 films
Films of the Weimar Republic
German drama films
German silent feature films
Films directed by Hans Steinhoff
1923 drama films
UFA GmbH films
German black-and-white films
Silent drama films
1920s German films